Shahin Suroor (Arabic:شاهين سرور) (born 21 June 1996) is an Emirati footballer. He currently plays as an attacking midfielder for Baniyas.

References

External links
 

Emirati footballers
1996 births
Living people
Al Jazira Club players
Al-Ittihad Kalba SC players
Baniyas Club players
Association football midfielders
UAE First Division League players
UAE Pro League players
Footballers at the 2018 Asian Games
Asian Games bronze medalists for the United Arab Emirates
Asian Games medalists in football
Medalists at the 2018 Asian Games